The Hämeenlinna Normal-Lycée was the first Finnish language 'Normal-Lycée' in Finland. Its notable alumni include the composer Jean Sibelius.

Secondary schools in Finland